Memo motion or spaced-shot photography is a tool of time and motion study that analyzes long operations by using a camera. It was developed 1946 by Marvin E. Mundel at Purdue University, who was first to save film material while planning studies on kitchen work.

Mundel published the method in 1947 with several studies in his textbook Systematic Motion and time study. A study showed the following advantages of Memo-Motion in regard to other forms of time and motion study:
Single operator repetition work ...
Aerea studies, the study of a group of men or machines.
Team studies.
Utilisation studies.
Work measurement.

As a versatile tool of work study it was used in the US to some extent, but rarely in Europe and other industrial countries mainly because of difficulties procuring the required cameras. Today Memo-Motion could have a comeback because more and more workplaces have conditions which it can explore.

References 

Time and motion study
Industrial equipment